Paratrachichthys is a genus of slimeheads found in the Pacific Ocean. It consists of three species, all known as sandpaper fish.

Species
There are currently 3 recognized species in this genus:
 Paratrachichthys fernandezianus (Günther, 1887) (Chilean sandpaper fish)
 Paratrachichthys macleayi (Johnston, 1881) (Australian sandpaper fish)
 Paratrachichthys trailli (F. W. Hutton, 1875) (sandpaper fish)

References

External links
 

 
Marine fish genera
Taxa named by Edgar Ravenswood Waite